The 1934 Tour of Flanders was held on 18 March 1934.

General classification

Final general classification

References
Résultats sur siteducyclisme.net
Résultats sur cyclebase.nl

External links
 

Tour of Flanders
1934 in Belgian sport
1934 in road cycling